Al-Shaykh Muwannis, also Sheikh Munis, was a small Palestinian Arab village in the Jaffa Subdistrict of Mandatory Palestine, located approximately 8.5 kilometers from the center of Jaffa city in territory earmarked for Jewish statehood under the UN Partition Plan. The village was abandoned in March 1948 due to the threats of Jewish militias, two months before the 1948 Arab–Israeli war. Today, Tel Aviv University lies on part of the village land.

History
According to local legend, the village was named for a local religious figure, al-Shaykh Muwannis, whose maqam was in the village.

Ottoman era
During the Ottoman era, Pierre Jacotin named  the village Dahr on his map from 1799.

Al-Shaykh Muwannis was noted in December 1821, as being "located on a hill surrounded by muddy land that was flooded with water despite the moderate winter". In 1856 the village was named Sheikh Muennis on Kiepert's map of Palestine published that year.

In 1870, Victor Guérin noted about al-Shaykh Muwannis: "It contains four hundred inhabitants and is divided into several quarters, each under the jurisdiction of a particular sheikh. On the outskirts one can note some gardens where succulent watermelons grow, with hardly any horticultural care."  In 1882, the  PEF's Survey of Western Palestine (SWP) noted "ruins of a house near the kubbeh", while Al-Shaykh Muwannis was described as an ordinary adobe village. Most of the villagers were members of the Abu Kishk tribe.

The village population was 315 in 1879.

British Mandate era
In the 1922 census of Palestine conducted by the British Mandate authorities,  Shaik Muannes had a population of 664 residents, all Muslims.  This had increased in the 1931 census when  Esh Sheikh Muwannis had 1154 inhabitants, still all Muslims, in 273 houses.

In the 1920s, the government of the British mandate attempted to gain title to lands lying to the west of Al-Shaykh Muwannis and extending to the coast of the Mediterranean Sea on the grounds that it was "waste and uncultivated." According to the authors of a book on the Israeli-Arab conflict, the Arabs of the Jaffa-Tel Aviv region "understood the implications of the Zionist-cum-British discourses of development generally and their implementation through town planning schemes." In 1937, the Arabic daily al Ja'miah al-Islamiyya commented on British plans to build a bypass road for Tel Aviv residents on what they claimed were village lands:  "[I]n reality the plan in the Town Planning Commission now including Sheikh Muwannis is not really a 'plan', but rather a plan to take the land out of the hands of its owners."

There were two schools in the village, a boys' school built in 1932 and a girls' school built in 1943. 266 students were registered in these schools in 1945. The villagers worked in agriculture, particularly citrus cultivation. In the 1945 statistics, 3,749 dunums were used for growing citrus and bananas, and 7,165 dunums of village land was used for cereals. 66 dunums were irrigated or used for orchards, irrigation water was drawn from al-Awja river and a large number of artesian wells. 41 dunams of village lands were classified as built-up areas.

In 1946,  three Arab villagers raped a Jewish girl. In the midst of the court proceedings, members of the Haganah shot and wounded one of the attackers, and kidnapped and castrated another. In 1947, in the wake of growing hostility in the days leading up to the war, some of the villagers began to leave. Most stayed, as village notables had secured Haganah protection in exchange for keeping the peace and preventing Arab Liberation Army (ALA) irregulars from using the village to attack Yishuv forces.

Before the 1948 war, the population of al-Shaykh Muwannis was 2,000.

1948 war and aftermath

In 1948, the population was largely made up of fellaheen who enjoyed friendly relations with Jews, despite occasional tension. While occasional shots were fired from the village toward Jewish residential areas in January and February 1948, there were no casualties, and the Abu Kishk abided by their promise to keep out ALA irregulars. The emissary of the ALA was informed by the Abu Kishk that "the Arabs of the area will cooperate with the Jews against any outside force that tries to enter."

Some intelligence reports, which were never corroborated, suggested that in early 1948 the village, which overlooked both the Sde Dov Airport and the Reading Power Station, was being infiltrated by heavily-armed Arab irregulars. On 7 March, the Haganah's Alexandroni Brigade imposed a 'quarantine' on the village by closing off all access roads to it and the two smaller satellite villages of Jalil al Shamaliyya and Jalil al Qibliya and may even have occupied houses on the edge of the village. The underground Stern Gang (LHI) maintained one of its encampments in the village, and, five days later, on 12 March, militants from either  the Irgun or Lehi groups kidnapped five village notables. The Jewish Intelligence Services noted that "many of the villagers ... began fleeing following the abduction of the notables of Sheikh Muwannis. The Arab learned that it was not enough to reach an agreement with the Haganah and that there were 'other Jews' of whom to beware, and possibly to be aware of more than the Haganah, which had not control over them."

The villagers then  protested that Jewish forces in the area were subjecting them to intimidation, looting and shooting at them randomly. Though the notables were turned over to the Haganah on the 23 March and returned to Shaykh Muwannis, most of the villagers there and in other villages north of the Yarkon River continued to leave, as their confidence had been "mortally undermined". Tawfiq Abu Kishk threw a large parting 'banquet' for the remaining villagers and their Jewish friends on the 28 March 1948. After their departure, the village lands were promptly allocated for Jewish use by the Yishuv leaders, and were ultimately incorporated into the municipality of Tel Aviv. 
 
In the days following, the Abu Kishk leaders attributed their abandonment of the village to: "a) the [Haganah] roadblocks ... b) the [Haganah] limitations on movement by foot, c) the theft [by Jews?] of vehicles, and d) the last kidnapping of Sheikh Muwannis men by the LHI." The villagers of Shaykh Muwannis became refugees, with the majority taking up residence in Qalqilya and Tulkarem.

According to the Palestinian historian Walid Khalidi, the village's remaining structures in 1992 consisted of several houses occupied by Jewish families and the wall of a house. Soon after the war, it was used to accommodate members of the new Israeli Air Force and men from Mahal units. It was initially repopulated, from 1949 onwards, by Jews from North Africa, called "Moroccans" by other Jews in the area, and much of its land, as the North African Jews were relocated, was taken over for the development of Tel Aviv University,  and the former home of the village sheikh, known as the 'Green House', serves as the University's faculty club.

In a right of return march organized by the Israeli group Zochrot on Nakba Day in 2004, participants called upon the Tel Aviv municipality to name six streets in the city after Palestinian villages that had existed there until 1948, among them, Al-Shaykh Muwannis.

See also
 Depopulated Palestinian locations in Israel

References

Bibliography

External links
Welcome to al-Shaykh-Muwannis,
Survey of Western Palestine, Map 13: IAA,  Wikimedia commons 
  Shaykh Muwannis, from Zochrot
, Zoroch
Tel Aviv University is asked to acknowledge its past and to commemorate the Palestinian village on which grounds the university was built, 2003, Zochrot
 2003.
Map, 1946

District of Jaffa
Arab villages depopulated prior to the 1948 Arab–Israeli War